Ivan Babić (15 December 1904 – 6 June 1982) was a Croatian soldier and lieutenant-colonel in the Croatian Home Guard and later an emigrant dissident writer against Communist Yugoslavia.

He attended gymnasium in Bjelovar. Babić became a military cadet in the Yugoslav Royal Army and was sent to Paris to perform further training at the École Superieure de Guerre.

World War II
During the German-led attack on the Kingdom of Yugoslavia, Babić served as a major in the 38th Drava Infantry Division. In 1942, he commanded the 369th Reinforced Infantry Regiment, commonly known as the Croatian Legion, which fought on the Eastern Front. In 1943, he headed the Home Guard Central School. In 1943, he flew a mission to American troops in Italy to suggest that the Allies invade the Dalmatian coast of the Independent State of Croatia to prevent the country from falling into communist hands. He claimed the invasion would meet no resistance and that the Croatian army would establish a beachhead for them. The British subsequently held him as prisoner of war in Bari.

After the war he worked for a period as an engineer in Venezuela. He was a frequent contributor to the Croatian emigrant weekly, Hrvatska revija (Croatian Review). He secured a visa for Croatian writer Bruno Bušić to come to Spain; Busić was later assassinated. He published U.S. Policy Towards Yugoslavia, which was translated into English by Mate Meštrović.

References

Sources

 

1904 births
1982 deaths
People from Sveti Ivan Žabno
People from the Kingdom of Croatia-Slavonia
Croatian collaborators with Fascist Italy
Croatian collaborators with Nazi Germany
Royal Yugoslav Army personnel
Croatian Home Guard personnel
Croatian military personnel of World War II
World War II prisoners of war held by the United Kingdom